Qilla Tek Singh is a village on the northern outskirts of Batala, Punjab, India. Its population is about 1300-1400. Most inhabitants work in farming and the rest commute to jobs in the city. It has a Government School situated in start of village that is very popular. 

Villages in Gurdaspur district